The Jiří Orten Award is a Czech literary prize given to the author of a work of prose or poetry who is no older than 30 at the time of the work's completion. The award is named after Czech poet Jiří Orten. The winner is awarded a prize of 50,000 Czech koruna.

Laureates

See also
List of Czech literary awards

References 

Czech literary awards